Roswell, Little Green Man was a Bongo Comics series created by Bill Morrison. It was nominated for four Eisner Awards. The series debuted in 1996 and ran for six issues.  

In an interview with Neatorama, Morrison said, "Roswell, Little Green Man was inspired by the story of the Roswell UFO crash, but also by my desire to draw vintage cars, fashions, architecture, etc. from the 1940's. I was also influenced heavily by Dave Stevens' wonderful Rocketeer strip."

References

External links
Roswell: Little Green Man at Beek's Books
Roswell: Little Green Man at The Simpsons Archive

Bongo Comics titles
Comics about extraterrestrial life
Roswell incident in fiction